In applied mathematics, the Morlely–Wang–Xu (MWX) element is a canonical construction of a family of piecewise polynomials with the minimal degree elements for any -th order of elliptic and parabolic equations in any spatial-dimension  for .

Morley–Wang–Xu element
The set of degrees of freedom will be given next.

For any , let  denote its measure, and let  be its unit outer normals which are linearly independent.  

For , any -dimensional

 

The degrees of freedom are depicted in Table 1. For , we obtain the well-known conforming linear element. For , we obtain a new cubic element on a simplex that has 20 degrees of freedom.

Generalizations
There are two generalizations of Morley–Wang–Xu element (which requires ).

: Nonconforming element
Table 1 depicts the degrees of freedom for the case that . This new family of finite element methods provides practical discretization methods for, say, a sixth order elliptic equations in 2D (which only has 12 local degrees of freedom). In addition, Wu and Xu propose an  nonconforming finite element that is robust for the sixth order singularly perturbed problems in 2D.

: Interior penalty nonconforming FEMs
An alternative generalization when  is developed by combining the interior penalty and nonconforming methods by Wu and Xu. The degrees of freedom are carefully designed to preserve the weak-continuity as much as possible.

 

where the nonconforming element is depicted in Figure 1. .

References 

Polynomials